The discography of the Japanese singer Maki Goto consists of five studio albums, two compilation albums, three extended plays, and twenty-three singles. After graduating from Morning Musume, Goto released her solo debut single, "Ai no Bakayarō", on March 28, 2001 and her first solo album, Makking Gold 1, on February 5, 2003. Her second album, 2 Paint It Gold, was released on January 24, 2004, and her third album, 3rd Station, was released on February 23, 2005.

Following the release of her fourth album, How to Use Sexy, Goto decided to depart from Hello! Project and their main agency, Up-Front Agency, citing conflicts of interest in the direction of her career. In 2008, she signed onto Avex Trax's label and released her first extended play as a collaboration with Sweet Black, where she is the featured artist.

Albums

Studio albums

Compilation albums

Extended plays

As lead artist

As featured artist

Singles

Promotional singles

Collaborations

Videography

DVDs

Music videos

References

External links

Discographies of Japanese artists
Pop music discographies